Hatschbachiella polyclada is a South American plant species that was first described by Swedish botanist Per Karl Hjalmar Dusén.

References

Eupatorieae
Endemic flora of Brazil
Flora of the Atlantic Forest
Flora of Paraná (state)